Jo Baier (born 13 February 1949) is a German film director and writer. He is married to Gertrud Baier.

Early life and education
Baier was born in Munich. He studied drama, German and English at the Ludwig Maximilians University. He graduated with a doctorate in 1980. Since 1979 he has directed primarily television documentaries and dramas.

As he grew up in a Bavarian village, his movies are often influenced by his childhood experiences.

Awards
Baier has received the Grimme-Preis and German Television Award. For , his debut as a theatrical director, he was nominated for the German Film Award.

Selected filmography
Schiefweg (1986, TV film) — (based on stories by Emerenz Meier)
Rosse (1989, TV film) — (based on a play by )
 (1991, TV film) — (biographical film about Emerenz Meier)
 (1995, TV film) — (based on a novel by Oskar Maria Graf)
 (1998, TV miniseries) — (based on a novel by Erwin Strittmatter)
Der Weibsteufel (2000, TV film) — (based on a play by Karl Schönherr)
 (2001, TV film) — (biographical film about Walter Sedlmayr)
 (2002, TV film)
 (2003, TV film) — (based on a novel by  about Swabian children)
Stauffenberg (Operation Valkyrie, 2004, TV film)
 (2006, TV film) — (based on an autobiographical book by Michael Degen)
 (2007, TV film)
 (2008, TV film) — (biographical film about Liesl Karlstadt and Karl Valentin)
Henri 4 (Henry of Navarre, 2010) — (based on novels by Heinrich Mann)
The End Is My Beginning (2010) — (based on an autobiographical book by Tiziano Terzani)
 (2012, TV film) — (based on a story by Hermann Hesse)
 (2016, TV film)

References

External links
 
 Jo Baier Filmportal.de 
 Jo Baier im Gespräch mit Carlos Gerstenhauer (German) (PDF, 2009)

1949 births
Living people
Film directors from Munich
Television people from Munich